Sar Kandeh-ye Pain (also Romanized as Sar Kandeh-ye Pā’īn; also known as Sar Kandeh) is a village in Shalal and Dasht-e Gol Rural District, in the Central District of Andika County, Khuzestan Province, Iran. At the 2006 census, its population was 24, in 5 families.

References 

Populated places in Andika County